This is a list of Irish-American mobsters which includes organized crime figures of predominantly Irish-American criminal organizations or individual mobsters from the early 1900s to the present. To be included in this list, the person must have a Wikipedia article and/or references showing the person is Irish American and a mobster.

List

Footnotes
1 Is of mixed ethnicity.

References

 
Mobsters
Organized crime-related lists